Jack Rodney Laundon (28 July 1934 – 31 December 2016) was a British lichenologist and became President of the British Lichen Society.

Education and personal life
Jack Rodney Laundon was born 28 July 1934 in Kettering, Northamptonshire. He was educated at Park Road School, Kettering Central School and Kettering Grammar School, and then worked at the British Museum (Natural History) from 1952 - 1990, mainly in the lichen section. He married Rita June Bransby in 1958 and they had one daughter. He died 31 December 2016.

Career
He was interested in lichen from his teens, and developed his interests in lichen ecology and taxonomy as well as the specimen curation and identification required by his post. This included curating the collection of specimens from Erik Acharius held at the Museum. He helped establish the use of chemotaxonomy for lichens at the Museum and was active in verifying specimens sent to the Museum. His application of the International Code of Botanical Nomenclature was sometimes controversial and led to changes in the code so that species names could be proposed for retention.

He published over 150 articles and several books during his career. These included a popular book Lichens (1986, 2001) illustrated with his own photographs. In 1956 he published a survey of the lichens of Northamptonshire, and was the first to apply the Scandinavian method of lichen communities to the UK. In 1960 his observation of  Lecidea (now Placynthiella) oligotropha in Northamptonshire was published. His surveys of the lichens of London in the late 1960s were the first to map species distributions relative to atmospheric sulphur dioxide levels. His records from gravestones demonstrated that lichen communities were retained on old memorials but did not colonise new ones. He continued to record and publish about lichen distributions until 2012, showing that lichens returned once sulphur dioxide levels fell.

Laundon was a founder member of the British Lichen Society. He was President of the Society in 1984–1985, having been editor of the British Lichen Society Bulletin from 1963 until 1979, and Honorary Secretary from 1964 - 1984. He was elected as Honorary member of the Society in 1988, and  received the Ursula Duncan Award in recognition of his services to the British Lichen Society in 2007.

He edited The London Naturalist from 1971 until 1979 and the Bulletin of the British Museum (Natural History), Botany Series from 1977 until 1990. He was a life member of the Museums Association, and was awarded a Fellowship of the Association in 1972.

He was required to retire in 1990 as part of restructuring at the Museum as it moved away from taxonomy, but he continued to be very active with lichens and Northamptonshire local history, including authoring several publications, until mid-December 2016, shortly before his death.

Legacy
The lichen Lepraria jackii was named in his honour in 1992, and the chemicals jackinic acid and norjackinic acid were described in 1995 and named after him. Laundon has been credited for introducing the term  in a 1995 publication, in an attempt to clarify what he thought were inadequate terms available to describe the range of fungal-algal interactions in the lichen symbiosis.

Trees were planted in his memory by the Kettering and District Natural History Society at Twywell Hills and Dales in November 2019

Selected publications

The most significant among his 150 publications were:

Laundon, J. R. (2010) Lecanora antiqua, a new saxicolous species from Great Britain, and the nomenclature and authorship of L. albescens, L. conferta and L. muralis. Lichenologist 42 6  631-636

Laundon, J. R. (2008) Some synonyms in Chrysothrix and Lepraria. Lichenologist 40 5  411-414

Laundon, J. R. (2005) The publication and typification of Sir James Edward Smith's lichens in English Botany. Botanical Journal of the Linnean Society 147 4 483-499

Laundon, J. R. (2003) Six lichens of the Lecanora varia group. Nova Hedwiga 76 1-2 83-111

Roos, M and Laundon, J. R. (1995) On the Classification of lichen photomorphs. Taxon 44 3 387-389

Elix, J.A., Naidu, R. and Laundon, J. R. (1994) The structure and synthesis of 4-oxypannaric acid 2-methyl ester, a dibenzofuran from the lichen Leproloma diffusum. Australian Journal of Chemistry 47 4 703-714

Laundon, J. R. (1992) Lepraria in the British Isles. Lichenologist 24 4 315-350

Diamantopoulos, I., Pirintsos, S., Laundon, J.R. and Vokou, D. (1992) The epiphytic lichens around Thessaloniki (Greece) as indicators of sulfur dioxide pollution. Lichenologist 24 1 63-71

Laundon, J. R. (1989) The species of Leproloma - the name for the Lepraria-Membranacea group. Lichenologist 21 1 1-22

Laundon, J. R. (1984) The typification of Withering neglected lichens. Lichenologist 16 3  211-239

Jones, D., Wilson, M.J. and Laundon, J. R. (1982) Observations on the location and form of lead in Stereocaulon vesuvianum. Lichenologist 14 3 281-286

Laundon, J. R. (1981) The species of Chrysothrix. Lichenologist 13 2 101-121

Laundon, J. R. (1979) Deceased lichenologists -  their abbreviations and herbaria. Lichenologist 11 1 1-26

Laundon, J. R. (1978) Haematomma chemotypes form fused thalli. Lichenologist 10 2  221-225

References 

1934 births
2016 deaths
20th-century British botanists
British lichenologists
Employees of the Natural History Museum, London
People from Kettering
20th-century British male writers
21st-century British male writers
British male non-fiction writers
21st-century British non-fiction writers
20th-century British non-fiction writers